Music & Me is a studio album by American singer SIRPAUL, recorded and released in 2010. The artist wrote, produced and recorded all the songs on the album. The album contains Pop music, with influences of R&B, Electronica, and Dance. On Logo's NewNowNext program (featuring the artist with interview clips as well as his videos), SIRPAUL described his music as "Next Generation New Wave Electro-Folk, combining acoustic and electric guitars with old school Hip-Hop and ElectroBeats."

Track listing

References

External links
 SIRPAUL's Official Site
 SIRPAUL's Official FaceBook site
 SIRPAUL's Official MySpace site
 SIRPAUL's Official Twitter page
 Music Review on That's My Jam Radio
 Music Review on Soundtrack to my Day
 Music Review on ElectroQueer

2010 albums
SIRPAUL albums